Liberty Cap is a granite dome in Yosemite National Park, California, United States which lies at the extreme northwestern margin of Little Yosemite Valley. It lies adjacent, to the north of Nevada Fall, on the John Muir Trail. A smaller, mesa-like dome called Mount Broderick stands immediately adjacent to Liberty Cap.

Origin of the name
California Governor Leland Stanford visited Yosemite in 1865, and he and James Hutchings visited Nevada Fall. Stanford didn't like any proposed names, and, looking at half-dollar reputably produced by Hutchings, saw a resemblance between the Liberty Cap and the coin's cap of liberty and decided the name better,.

Climbing 
The easiest routes starts at Happy Isles in Yosemite Valley and follow either the John Muir Trail or the Mist Trail to the top of Nevada Falls. Cross the bridge over the Merced River and climb the short ridge.  From the granite slabs on the ridge ascend the Northeast Gully to the summit.

There are a number of technical routes on Liberty Cap ranging in difficulty from class 5.8 to 5.11.

Climbing Liberty Cap requires a wilderness permit, obtainable at all Yosemite visitor centers.

References 

Granite domes of Yosemite National Park
Mountains of Mariposa County, California